Die, Rugged Man, Die is the debut studio album by American rapper R.A. the Rugged Man. It was released on November 16, 2004, by Nature Sounds.

This debut was over a decade in the making. R.A. the Rugged Man recorded his first album, Night of the Bloody Apes, for Jive Records in 1992 and American Lowlife for Priority Records in 1998. Although it is the Rugged Man's third album Die, Rugged Man, Die became the first album he released commercially. Guest appearances include Masta Killa, Killah Priest, Timbo King and Human Beatbox Bub. The song "Black And White" features on the THQ & Volition video game Saints Row.

Track listing

Personnel
Human Beatbox Bub - Beat Boxer/ vocals
Ayatollah – producer
Juhi Baig – stylist
Big Earth The Midget Face – vocals
Chris Bittner – engineer
Calogero – producer
Phil Cassese – vocals
Chris Conway – mixing
Eugine "Mean Gene" Crocket – executive
Dan the Man – engineer
Dev One – producer, engineer
Sumner Dilworth – cover photo
L. Dionne – vocals
DJ Luciano – producer, engineer
DJ U-vex – scratching
Darryl Jenifer – vocals (background), producer
Sacha Jenkins – producer
Jocko – producer
Marc 'Nigga' Nilez – producer
Michael Sarsfield – mastering

References

External links
 

2004 debut albums
R.A. the Rugged Man albums
Nature Sounds albums
Albums produced by Ayatollah
Albums produced by J-Zone